Ernstia gracilis is a species of calcareous sponge from northern California.

References

Sponges described in 1872
Invertebrates of the United States
Taxa named by Ernst Haeckel